Roger la Honte is a 1933 French historical drama film directed by Gaston Roudès and starring Constant Rémy, Germaine Rouer and France Dhélia. It is an adaptation of the 1886 novel of the same name by Jules Mary. The film's sets were designed by the art director Claude Bouxin.

Cast
 Constant Rémy as Roger Laroque  
 Germaine Rouer as Henriette Laroque  
 France Dhélia as Julia de Noirville  
 Marcelle Monthil as Victoire  
 Olympe Bradna as Suzanne Laroque 
 Samson Fainsilber as Lucien de Noirville  
 Paul Escoffier as Le juge d'instruction  
 Édouard Delmont as L'inspecteur  
 Marcel Maupi as L'inspecteur  
 Raymond Narlay as Le président des assises 
 Georges Mauloy as Le commissaire aux délégations  
 Henri Bosc  as Luversan 
 Jean Arbuleau

References

Bibliography 
 Goble, Alan. The Complete Index to Literary Sources in Film. Walter de Gruyter, 1999.

External links 
 

1933 films
French historical drama films
1930s historical drama films
1930s French-language films
Films directed by Gaston Roudès
Films based on French novels
Films set in the 19th century
French black-and-white films
1933 drama films
1930s French films